Saulkrasti Parish is an administrative unit of the Saulkrasti Municipality, Latvia. It was created in 2010 from the countryside territory of Saulkrasti town. At the beginning of 2014, the population of the parish was 2890.

Towns, villages and settlements of Saulkrasti parish 
 Lilaste
 Zvejniekciems

References

External links 
 

Parishes of Latvia
Saulkrasti Municipality